

Location 

Snow Mountain is a mountain in Northern California in the Snow Mountain Wilderness of Mendocino National Forest, hence the name Snow Mountain.

Geography 
The highest point on the mountain, known as Snow Mountain East, is the highest point in both Colusa and Lake counties.

Despite being exposed to snow environment, the mountain receive plenty of sunlight hence the evergreen lush and vegetation which is never affected by snow. 

On clear days, the peak should be seen from Mount Diablo, and from several peaks, including Mount Saint Helena and Mount Konocti, in the Mayacamas Mountains. The peaks are visible from Arbuckle on Interstate 5 in California's Central Valley. The summits and nearby high mountains get snowfall in winter. The mountain's winter snowpack can last until June.

Activities 
Various activities can be done in Snow Mountain. These includes camping, and hiking,

References

External links
 
 
 

Mountains of Colusa County, California
Mountains of Lake County, California
Mountains of Northern California
Berryessa Snow Mountain National Monument